The 1887 Dulwich by-election was a by-election held on 30 November 1887 for the British House of Commons constituency of Dulwich in South London.

The by-election was triggered by the appointment of the serving Conservative Party Member of Parliament (MP), John Morgan Howard, as a judge in Cornwall.

The Conservative candidate was John Blundell Maple, who had unsuccessfully contested St Pancras South at the 1885 general election.  The Liberal candidate was James Henderson.

The main issue in the by-election was the question of Irish Home Rule, which Henderson, a supporter of Gladstone, supported. The Liberal Unionists in the constituency supported Maple.

Votes

See also 
 List of United Kingdom by-elections
 Dulwich constituency

References 

 The Times, 1 December 1887

By-elections to the Parliament of the United Kingdom in London constituencies
1887 elections in the United Kingdom
1887 in London
Elections in the London Borough of Southwark
By-election, 1887